The 2009 All-Ireland Senior Camogie Championship Final was the 78th All-Ireland Final and the deciding match of the 2009 All-Ireland Senior Camogie Championship, an inter-county camogie tournament for the top teams in Ireland.

Cork had an easy win.

References

All-Ireland Senior Camogie Championship Final
All-Ireland Senior Camogie Championship Final
All-Ireland Senior Camogie Championship Final, 2009
All-Ireland Senior Camogie Championship Finals
Cork county camogie team matches
Kilkenny county camogie team matches